Lucretia (minor planet designation: 281 Lucretia) is an asteroid belonging to the Flora family in the Main Belt. It was discovered by Austrian astronomer Johann Palisa on 31 October 1888 in Vienna, and is named after the middle name of Caroline Herschel, one of the first female astronomers. The spin axis appears nearly perpendicular to the ecliptic.

References

External links
 
 

Flora asteroids
Lucretia
Lucretia
SU-type asteroids (Tholen)
S-type asteroids (SMASS)
18881031